Luis Antonio Araneda Jorquera (born 9 May 1953) is a Chilean former footballer. He played in four matches for the Chile national football team from 1974 to 1976. He was also part of Chile's squad for the 1975 Copa América tournament.

References

External links
 
 Luis Araneda at PlaymakerStats
 Luis Araneda at PartidosdeLaRoja 

1953 births
Living people
Footballers from Santiago
Chilean footballers
Chilean expatriate footballers
Chile international footballers
Association football forwards
Colo-Colo footballers
Deportes Temuco footballers
Lota Schwager footballers
Audax Italiano footballers
Santiago Morning footballers
Trasandino footballers
Everton de Viña del Mar footballers
San Luis de Quillota footballers
Deportes Valdivia footballers
Deportes Melipilla footballers
Chilean Primera División players
Ecuadorian Serie B players
Primera B de Chile players
Tercera División de Chile players
Chilean expatriate sportspeople in Ecuador
Expatriate footballers in Ecuador
1975 Copa América players